Dâmbu may refer to several places in Romania:

 Dâmbu, a village in Sânpetru de Câmpie Commune, Mureș County
 Dâmbu, a village in the town of Băicoi, Prahova County
 Dâmbu (river), a tributary of the Teleajen in Prahova County